Ellos Group is a  Swedish home shopping and e-commerce company headquartered in Borås, Sweden. Ellos Group has operations mainly in the Nordics along with other European countries.

History
Ellos was founded in 1947 by Olle Blomqvist and Lars Gustafsson. They wanted their company to be named "LO:s," from their names, but were not allowed to register the name as LO already used it. There is a rumour that name "Ellos" was Olle's name backwards with a genitive "s" at the end, first popularised with the widely popular Swedish talk show Hylands hörna.

In 1978, the company moved to its current location in Viared, 10 km west of Borås; the new premises were inaugurated by Carl XVI Gustaf, the king of Sweden.

In 1988, the ICA concern acquired the company, which then had 1 500 employees.

Between 1997-2013, Ellos was a part of Redcats, which is owned by the holding company PPR.

Since 2013, Ellos Group is owned by the Sweden-based venture capital company Nordic Capital. Ellos is one of Scandinavia’s leading home shopping companies with an annual turnover of more than €200 million and 620 employees.

Ellos Group offers several own brands, Ellos within apparel and home products, and Jotex within home textile and decoration. Sub-brands within Ellos include Áhkká, Staycation, Ellos On Our Terms and Ellos Home among others.

Ellos is one of the main sponsors of the football club Elfsborg.

References

1.   http://www.svd.se/naringsliv/nyheter/sverige/nordic-capital-koper-ellos-och-jotex_7942916.svd

External links
Ellos - Official web-site
Ellos.se
Ellos.co.uk
Ellos.ru

Retail companies of Sweden
Retail companies established in 1947
1947 establishments in Sweden
Companies based in Västra Götaland County